Costa do Sol may refer to:

Clube de Desportos da Costa do Sol, commonly known as Costa do Sol, a Mozambican sports club based in Maputo.
Portuguese Riviera, also known as Costa do Sol, an affluent coastal region to the west of Lisbon, Portugal, centered on the coastal municipalities of Cascais (including Estoril, a famed luxury tourist destination in its own right) and Sintra.